Gouvães Dam is a rockfield dam on the Torno River. It is located in the municipality Vila Pouca de Aguiar, in Vila Real District, Portugal and it is part of the wider Tâmega Electricity-Generating Group formed of three dams and three plants

Iberdrola signed a 70-year concession with the Government of Portugal in July 2014 for the design, construction and operation of three projects: Alto Tâmega, Daivões and Gouvães dams.

Construction of the dam completed in July 2022.

Dam

Reservoir
The reservoir surface area for the dam has .

Power plant 

The dam also includes  of tunnels along with a  shaft.

See also

 List of power stations in Portugal
 List of dams and reservoirs in Portugal

References

Dams in Portugal
Hydroelectric power stations in Portugal
Dams completed in 2022
Energy infrastructure completed in 2022
2022 establishments in Portugal